Sabarkantha Lok Sabha constituency ( / साबरकांठा) is one of 26 Lok Sabha (parliamentary)  constituencies in Gujarat state in western India.

Vidhan Sabha segments
Presently, Sabarkantha Lok Sabha constituency comprises seven Vidhan Sabha (legislative assembly) segments. These are:

Members of Lok Sabha

^ by poll

Election Results

General Election 2019

General Election 2014

General Elections 2009

General Elections 2004

1952
 Nanda, Gulzarilal Bulaqiram (INC) : 106,048 votes 	
 Maharaj Himmatsinhji Dowlatsinhji (Ind) : 83,674

See also
 Sabarkantha district
 List of Constituencies of the Lok Sabha

Notes

Lok Sabha constituencies in Gujarat
Sabarkantha district